Mount Lowry is a mountain,  high, standing  northwest of the Wrigley Bluffs in the Anderson Hills, in the northern part of the Patuxent Range, Pensacola Mountains, Antarctica. It was mapped by the United States Geological Survey from surveys and U.S. Navy air photos from 1956 to 1966, and was named by the Advisory Committee on Antarctic Names for James K. Lowry, a biologist at Palmer Station in the winter of 1967.

References

Mountains of Queen Elizabeth Land
Pensacola Mountains